Elizabeth is an outer northern suburb of the Adelaide metropolitan area, South Australia, 24 km north of the Adelaide city centre. It is located in the City of Playford. At the 2016 census, Elizabeth had a population of 1,024.

Established in 1955, it was the seat of the former local government body, the Old City of Elizabeth, which included Elizabeth as well as the immediately adjacent suburbs on all sides except the west. Although the City of Elizabeth no longer exists, having been amalgamated into the much larger City of Playford in 1997, the term "Elizabeth", in the context of Adelaide, typically refers to the historic municipality and the distinct community therein.

History
Before the 1950s, most of the area surrounding today's suburb of Elizabeth was farming land. After the end of the Second World War with its shortage of materials, the state government decided that South Australia needed to grow and become industrialised. A satellite city was planned for northern metropolitan fringe of Adelaide between the existing townships of Salisbury and Smithfield.

The township (now suburb) of Elizabeth was established on 16 November 1955, being named after Queen Elizabeth II, former queen of Australia, and inaugurated by Sir Thomas Playford, who was then premier of South Australia.

The town council was briefly renamed the District Council of Salisbury and Elizabeth on 22 August 1963. On 13 February 1964, a new local government body, the municipality of Elizabeth, later called City of Elizabeth, was created by severance from the District Council of Salisbury.

Geography
Elizabeth is the seat of the Playford local government area and thus acts as a central business district for the surrounding suburbs. It lies mostly between the Gawler railway line and the hills face. DSTO Edinburgh is located to the west of Elizabeth.

Demographics
The 2016 Australian census by the Australian Bureau of Statistics counted 1,024 persons in the suburb of Elizabeth on census night. Of these, 543 (52.9%) were male and 483 (47.1%) were female.

The majority of residents 657 (65.2%) were born in Australia, while 81 (8.0%) were born in England.

The median age of Elizabeth residents was 38. Children aged 0–14 years made up 16.7% of the population and people aged 65 years and over made up 14.8% of the population.

Afghanistan was third as place of birth and parents' birth after Australia and England, overtaking Scotland, and Hazaraghi was the language next most frequently spoken at home after English.

In 2007, Northern Sound System was established at 71 Elizabeth Way. The centre has offered programs, courses and workshops in various skills, including DJ, hip hop music, youth choir, gaming and animation; songwriting and music production, and it also includes recording studios, a live music venue, and rehearsal spaces.

Facilities and attractions

The City of Playford civic centre houses the council chambers, the Elizabeth branch of the Playford Library and the Shedley Theatre.   

Westerly adjacent to the civic centre is the Elizabeth Shopping Centre at the heart of the suburb. Formerly known as Elizabeth Town Centre, it has been progressively expanded since the 1960s. In its early days it featured open-air malls, but today it comprises a single storey undercover mall. A major renovation and extension was completed in 2004.

Parks
Dauntsey Reserve is located between Winterslow Road and Woodford Road. Ridley Reserve is located on the suburb's southern boundary. There are other parks and reserves in the suburb.

Schools
Playford International College (formerly Fremont-Elizabeth City High School) is on Philip Highway. Kaurna Plains School is on Ridley Road.

Sport
Elizabeth is the home of the Central District Bulldogs, an Australian rules football team in the South Australian National Football League (SANFL). The team hwon nine SANFL premierships in the period from 2000 to 2010. They play all of their home games at Elizabeth Oval (currently named "X Convenience Oval").

Elizabeth also has an association football club (soccer), the Playford City Patriots, who play in the South Australian State League. However, their home stadium is Ramsay Park in Edinburgh North, westerly adjacent to Elizabeth.

Transport

Roads
Elizabeth is serviced by Main North Road, connecting the suburb to Adelaide city centre, and by Philip Highway.

Public transport
Elizabeth is serviced by public transport run by the Adelaide Metro.

The Gawler railway line passes beside the suburb. The closest station is Elizabeth.

Elizabeth is serviced by buses run by the Adelaide Metro.

Media
The local newspaper was the now-closed News Review Messenger. The Bunyip newspaper also covers the Elizabeth area in its Playford Times section.

See also
List of Adelaide suburbs

References

External links

Suburbs of Adelaide
Populated places established in 1955
1955 establishments in Australia